Łukasz Bogusławski (born 11 February 1993) is a Polish professional footballer who plays as a centre-back for Znicz Pruszków.

Career

Olimpia Grudziądz
On 29 August 2019 it was confirmed, that Bogusławski had joined Olimpia Grudziądz on a contract until the summer 2020 with an option for another year.

Wigry Suwałki
On 11 September 2020 he signed with Wigry Suwałki.

Znicz Pruszków
Following Wigry's withdrawal from II liga, on 25 June 2022 Bogusławski joined Znicz Pruszków on a one-year contract.

References

External links
 
 

Polish footballers
1993 births
Living people
Poland youth international footballers
Ekstraklasa players
I liga players
II liga players
III liga players
Jagiellonia Białystok players
Legia Warsaw players
Legia Warsaw II players
Widzew Łódź players
Chrobry Głogów players
Górnik Łęczna players
Zagłębie Sosnowiec players
GKS Tychy players
Olimpia Grudziądz players
Wigry Suwałki players
Znicz Pruszków players
People from Augustów
Association football defenders